The Free Conservative Party (FKP) was a liberal-conservative political party in Prussia and the German Empire which emerged from the Prussian Conservative Party in the Prussian Landtag in 1866. In the federal elections to the Reichstag parliament from 1871, it ran as the German Reich Party (DRP). DRP was classified as centrist or centre-right by political standards at the time, and it also put forward the slogan "conservative progress". 

The Free Conservative Association achieved party status in 1867, comprising German nobles and East Elbian Junkers (land owners) like Duke Victor of Ratibor, Adolf von Arnim-Boitzenburg, Eduard Georg von Bethusy-Huc, Wilhelm von Kardorff and Karl Rudolf Friedenthal, Octavio von Zedlitz-Neukirch, Karl von Gamp-Massaunen, Christian Kraft zu Hohenlohe-Öhringen, Hermann, Prince of Hohenlohe-Langenburg, Hugo zu Hohenlohe-Öhringen industrialists and government officials like  Johann Viktor Bredt, Hermann von Hatzfeldt, Hermann von Dechend, Friedrich Alfred Krupp, Eduard Puricelli, Carl Ferdinand von Stumm-Halberg, Prince Karl Max von Lichnowsky, diplomats Herbert von Bismarck and Willibald von Dirksen, Wilko Levin von Wintzingerode or generals Hans Hartwig von Beseler and Eduard von Liebert, jurists Heinrich von Achenbach, Otto Arendt, Karl Heinrich von Boetticher, Robert Hue de Grais, Heinrich Triepel and scholars like Hans Delbrück, Adolf Grabowsky and Otto Hoetzsch.

It was distinguished from the German Conservative Party established in 1876 by its unqualified support of German unification and was seen as the political party which beside the National Liberals was closest in views to those of Chancellor Otto von Bismarck, including his Anti-Socialist Laws and Kulturkampf policies. The party was generally dominated by conservative industrialists and while it opposed political liberalism it also tended to support free trade and the development of industry. Upon the accession of Emperor Wilhelm II in 1888, the party backed his naval policies and the formation of the German colonial empire, approaching towards the German nationalist Pan-German League pressure group while centrists like Adolf Grabowsky did not prevail.

The party disbanded in November 1918 following the end of the Hohenzollern monarchy and the German Revolution. Several members had supported the formation of the German Fatherland Party in 1917, now most of its constituency turned to the newly established German National People's Party while some also joined the national liberal German People's Party.

See also 
 Conservatism in Germany

References 

1866 establishments in Prussia
Centre-right parties in Europe
Centrist parties in Germany
Christian political parties in Germany
Conservative parties in Germany
Defunct political parties in Germany
German nationalist political parties
Liberal conservative parties in Germany
National conservative parties
Political parties established in 1866
Political parties of the German Empire
Political parties disestablished in 1918
Protestant political parties